Yule (also called Jul, jól or joulu) is a festival historically observed by the Germanic peoples. Scholars have connected the original celebrations of Yule to the Wild Hunt, the god Odin, and the pagan Anglo-Saxon  ("Mothers' Night"). Some present-day Christmas customs and traditions such as the Yule log, Yule goat, Yule boar, Yule singing, and others may have connections to older pagan Yule traditions. Yule and cognates are still used in English and the Scandinavian languages as well as in Finnish and Estonian to describe Christmas and other festivals occurring during the winter holiday season.

Etymology
The modern English noun Yule descends from Old English , earlier geoh(h)ol, geh(h)ol, and geóla, sometimes plural. Whether the term existed exterior to the Germanic languages remains uncertain, though numerous speculative attempts have been made to find Indo-European cognates outside the Germanic group, too. The compound noun Yuletide ('Yule-time') is first attested from around 1475.

The word is conjectured in an explicitly pre-Christian context primarily in Old Norse, where it is associated with Old Norse deities. Among many others (see List of names of Odin), the long-bearded god Odin bears the name  ('the Yule one'). In , composed in the 12th century,  is interpreted as coming from one of Odin's names, closely related to Old Norse , a poetic name for the gods. In Old Norse poetry, the word is found as a term for 'feast', e.g.  (→ 'a raven's feast').

It has been thought that Old French  (→ French ), which was borrowed into English in the 14th century as 'jolly', is itself borrowed from Old Norse  (with the Old French suffix ; compare Old French  "easy", Modern French  =  "feast" + ). The French word is first attested in the Anglo-Norman , or "History of the English People", written by Geoffrey Gaimar between 1136 and 1140.

Germanic paganism
Yule is an indigenous winter festival celebrated by the Germanic peoples. The earliest references to it are in the form of month names, where the Yuletide period lasts somewhere around two months, falling along the end of the modern calendar year between what is now mid-November and early January.

Attestations

Months, heiti and kennings

Yule is attested early in the history of the Germanic peoples; in a Gothic language calendar of the 5–6th century it appears in the month name , and, in the 8th century, the English historian Bede wrote that the Anglo-Saxon calendar included the months  or  corresponding to either modern December or December and January.

While the Old Norse month name  is similarly attested, the Old Norse corpus also contains numerous references to an event by the Old Norse form of the name, . In chapter 55 of the Prose Edda book , different names for the gods are given; one is "Yule-beings". A work by the skald Eyvindr skáldaspillir that uses the term is then quoted: "again we have produced Yule-being's feast [mead of poetry], our rulers' eulogy, like a bridge of masonry".

Heitstrenging
In these sources, the tradition takes place on Yule-evening and consists of people placing their hands on a pig referred to as a sonargöltr before swearing solemn oaths. In the latter text, some manuscripts explicitly refer to the pig as holy, that it was devoted to Freyr and that after the oath-swearing it was sacrificed.

Saga of Hákon the Good
The Saga of  the Good credits King Haakon I of Norway who ruled from 934 to 961 with the Christianization of Norway as well as rescheduling Yule to coincide with Christian celebrations held at the time.  The saga says that when Haakon arrived in Norway he was a confirmed Christian, but since the land was still altogether heathen and the people retained their pagan practices, Haakon hid his Christianity to receive the help of the "great chieftains". In time, Haakon had a law passed establishing that Yule celebrations were to take place at the same time as the Christians celebrated Christmas, "and at that time everyone was to have ale for the celebration with a measure of grain, or else pay fines, and had to keep the holiday while the ale lasted."

Yule had previously been celebrated for three nights from midwinter night, according to the saga. Haakon planned that when he had solidly established himself and held power over the whole country, he would then "have the gospel preached". According to the saga, the result was that his popularity caused many to allow themselves to be baptized, and some people stopped making sacrifices. Haakon spent most of this time in Trondheim. When Haakon believed that he wielded enough power, he requested a bishop and other priests from England, and they came to Norway. On their arrival, "Haakon made it known that he would have the gospel preached in the whole country." The saga continues, describing the different reactions of various regional things.

A description of pagan Yule practices is provided (notes are Hollander's own):

It was ancient custom that when sacrifice was to be made, all farmers were to come to the heathen temple and bring along with them the food they needed while the feast lasted. At this feast all were to take part of the drinking of ale. These were fashioned like sprinklers, and with them were to be smeared all over with blood the pedestals of the idols and also the walls of the temple within and without; and likewise the men present were to be sprinkled with blood. But the meat of the animals was to be boiled and served as food at the banquet. Fires were to be lighted in the middle of the temple floor, and kettles hung over the fires. The sacrificial beaker was to be borne around the fire, and he who made the feast and was chieftain, was to bless the beaker as well as all the sacrificial meat.

The narrative continues that toasts were to be drunk. The first toast was to be drunk to Odin "for victory and power to the king", the second to the gods  and  "for good harvests and for peace", and third, a beaker was to be drunk to the king himself. In addition, toasts were drunk to the memory of departed kinsfolk. These were called .

Academic reception
Scholars have connected the month event and Yule period to the Wild Hunt (a ghostly procession in the winter sky), the god Odin (who is attested in Germanic areas as leading the Wild Hunt and bears the name ), and increased supernatural activity, such as the Wild Hunt and the increased activities of —undead beings who walk the earth.

, an event focused on collective female beings attested by Bede as having occurred among the pagan Anglo-Saxons on what is now Christmas Eve, has been seen as further evidence of a fertility event during the Yule period.

The events of Yule are generally held to have centered on midwinter (although specific dating is a matter of debate), with feasting, drinking, and sacrifice. Scholar Rudolf Simek says the pagan Yule feast "had a pronounced religious character" and that "it is uncertain whether the Germanic Yule feast still had a function in the cult of the dead and in the veneration of the ancestors, a function which the mid-winter sacrifice certainly held for the West European Stone and Bronze Ages." The traditions of the Yule log, Yule goat, Yule boar (still reflected in the Christmas ham), Yule singing, and others possibly have connections to pre-Christian Yule customs, which Simek says "indicates the significance of the feast in pre-Christian times."

Contemporary traditions

Relationship with Christmas in Northern Europe
In modern Germanic language-speaking areas and some other Northern European countries, yule and its cognates denote the Christmas holiday season.

Modern paganism
As contemporary pagan religions differ in both origin and practice, these representations of Yule can vary considerably despite the shared name. Some Heathens, for example, celebrate in a way as close as possible to how they believe ancient Germanic pagans observed the tradition, while others observe the holiday with rituals "assembled from different sources." Heathen celebrations of Yule can also include sharing a meal and gift giving.

In most forms of Wicca, this holiday is celebrated at the winter solstice as the rebirth of the Great horned hunter god, who is viewed as the newborn solstice sun. The method of gathering for this sabbat varies by practitioner. Some have private ceremonies at home, while others do so with their covens:

{{quyote|Generally meeting in covens, which anoint their own priests and priestesses, Wiccans chant and cast or draw circles to invoke their deities, mainly during festivals like Samhain and Yule, which coincide with Halloween and Christmas, and when the moon is full.

LaVeyan Satanism
The Church of Satan and other LaVeyan Satanist groups celebrate Yule as an alternative to the Christian Christmas holiday. Yule in LaVeyan Satanism is not celebrated with the same rituals as in contemporary paganism or Heathenry.

See also

 , an event attested from Old Norse sources as having occurred among the pagan Norse
 Julebord, the modern Scandinavian Christmas feast
 Koliada, a Slavic winter festival
 Lohri, a Punjabi winter solstice festival
 , an event attested by Bede as having occurred among the pagan Anglo-Saxons on what is now Christmas Eve
 , an ancient Roman festival in honor of the deity Saturn, held on 17 December and expanded with festivities through 23 December
 Yaldā Night, an Iranian festival celebrated on the "longest and darkest night of the year."
 Nardogan, the birth of the sun, is an ancient Turkic festival that celebrates the winter solstice.

References

Notes

Citations

Works cited

External links

 
Christmas-linked holidays
Christmas
Early Germanic calendar
Early Germanic festivals
English folklore
Germanic paganism
December observances
January observances
Modern pagan holidays
Northumbrian folklore
Religious holidays
Scottish folklore
Quarter days
Events in Norse mythology
Eating parties
Odin